Attavar Balakrishna Shetty (1883–1960) better known as A. B. Shetty was an Indian politician, philanthropist, entrepreneur and the founder of Vijaya Bank.

Biography 
Shetty was born in a Tulu-speaking family of landlords to Mulki Kalappa Shetty (Father) and Attavar Unhakke (Mother). He completed his early education in Mangalore. Realising the need for dissemination of news and information about world affairs among people in the South Canara district, he started a weekly Kannada language publication, called "Navayuga", which was edited in its early years by K. K. Shetty and later by K. Honnayya Shetty.  This was very popular for more than 40 years. In addition Shetty was also the pioneer behind Canara Printing Press, a printing press in Mangalore.

Shetty established Vijaya Bank in 1931 at Bunts Hostel in Mangalore. The bank did well, providing job opportunities for thousands of youths and also providing banking service to lakhs of people all over the country. Vijaya Bank is today one of the foremost nationalised banks of India. Deeply secular and progressive in outlook, Shetty was interested in the activities of the Theosophical Society, the Brahmo Samaj, the Arya Samaj, the Depressed Classes Mission, etc., all of which were engaged in the uplift of neglected sections of society. He also served as Minister in the Madras Presidency and later in Madras State, holding various portfolios such as agriculture and veterinary, medical and public health, cooperation, housing and ex-servicemen between the years 1949-1956 until quitting the Ministry on 1 March 1956 following the States Reorganisation Act of 1956.

He married Kalyani Shetty. They had four children: two sons and two daughters. He died in 1960 at the age of 77 and is commemorated by the A.B.Shetty Memorial Institute of Dental Sciences, Deralakatte, Mangalore.

References

1883 births
1960 deaths
Mangaloreans
Karnataka local politicians
Indian bankers
People from Dakshina Kannada district
Karnataka politicians
20th-century Indian philanthropists
Indian founders
Madras MLAs 1952–1957
Indian National Congress politicians from Karnataka